The Morne l'Enfer Formation is a geologic formation in Trinidad and Tobago. It preserves fossils dating back to the Miocene to Early Pliocene period.

See also 

 List of fossiliferous stratigraphic units in Trinidad and Tobago

References 

Geologic formations of Trinidad and Tobago
Neogene Trinidad and Tobago
Shale formations
Sandstone formations